TSL may refer to:

Business
Trina Solar Limited, a Chinese solar power company traded on the New York Stock Exchange under the ticker "TSL"
Technology Sales Leads, multinational company providing outsourced sales and marketing
The Software Link, a defunct software company
TSL Limited, a Zimbabwean company
Transformer Specialties Ltd (TSL), a New Zealand manufacturer

Games and sports
The Spring League, a developmental American football organization
The Silver Lining (video game), a 2010 fan-created game based on the Kings Quest series
Star Wars: Knights of the Old Republic II The Sith Lords, a video game
Teen Second Life, a version of Second Life reserved for teenagers
Tasmanian State League, the premier Australian rules football competition in Tasmania, a state of Australia
Turkish Süper Lig, the top-flight league in Turkish nationwide football
Team Liquid Starleague professional gaming tournament for Starcraft 2 by Team Liquid

Language
 Taiwanese Sign Language, used in Taiwan
 Trisyllabic laxing, a process in English whereby long vowels become short
 Turkish Sign Language, used in Turkey

Media
The Simple Life, a TV series featuring Paris Hilton and Nicole Richie
The Suite Life on Deck, a spinoff from The Suite Life of Zack & Cody
The Suite Life of Zack & Cody, an American sitcom
This Spartan Life, a machinima talk show
This Sporting Life, an Australian radio comedy show
The Space Lady, a US singer, musician and composer in the genres of synth pop, psychedelic pop and outsider music
Time spent listening, one of the measurements surveyed by Arbitron in determining ratings for radio stations in the U.S.
The Starting Line, a pop-punk band from the Philadelphia, Pennsylvania area
The Student Life, a student newspaper publication at the Claremont Colleges in Claremont, California

Technology
Test-and-set, an atomic operation used for computer program synchronization
Transmitter/studio link, sends telemetry data from the remotely located transmitter back to the studio for monitoring purposes
Trustix Secure Linux

Transport
 Thomson MRT line in Singapore
 Tin Shui Wai stop in Hong Kong (MTR station code)

Other uses
 Trinity Sergius Laura, not far from Moscow, Russia
 TSL color space based on tint, saturation, and luminance

See also
Silver Lining (disambiguation)